Jonathan Ho Kai-ming (born 6 January 1985) is a Hong Kong politician. He is member of the Hong Kong Federation of Trade Unions (HKFTU) and former member of the Kwun Tong District Council. In the 2016 Hong Kong Legislative Council election, he is elected to the Legislative Council of Hong Kong through Labour functional constituency.

He was educated at Tak Sun School and Wah Yan College, Kowloon. He graduated from the Chinese University of Hong Kong. He is member of the Hong Kong Federation of Trade Unions and member of the social
affairs committee of the HKFTU. He was first elected to the Kwun Tong District Council in Pak Nga in the 2011 District Council election, and  lost his seat in 2019.

He first participated in the 2012 Legislative Council election, standing in the fourth place in the FTU's Kowloon East ticket. In the 2016 election, he took the HKFTU's seat in the Labour functional constituency with Luk Chung-hung in the Legislative Council of Hong Kong.

References

1985 births
Alumni of the Chinese University of Hong Kong
Living people
Hong Kong trade unionists
Hong Kong Federation of Trade Unions
District councillors of Kwun Tong District
HK LegCo Members 2016–2021